SS Duchess of York was one of a class of four steam turbine ocean liners built in Glasgow in 1927–29 for Canadian Pacific Steamships Ltd's transatlantic service between Britain and Canada.

In the Second World War Duchess of York was converted into a troop ship. In 1943 an attack by enemy aircraft killed 27 people aboard her and left the ship burning and badly damaged. The Royal Navy sank her the next day.

Pre-war service
The four were cabin liners built for Canadian Pacific's transatlantic service. Duchess of York was employed on the Liverpool to Quebec and Montreal route. During the winter months when the Saint Lawrence River was frozen (typically November to April), she sailed to Saint John, New Brunswick. The four ships were nicknamed the "Drunken Duchesses" for their "lively" motion in heavy seas.

The Duchess was built by John Brown & Company of Clydebank. She was to be named Duchess of Cornwall, but for £250, Red Funnel Line agreed to swap names with their  paddle steamer Duchess of York, which had been launched in 1896. With that, the ocean liner Duchess of York was launched by her namesake, Elizabeth Bowes-Lyon, the Duchess of York, on September 28, 1928.

Her first captain between 1929 and 1934 was Ronald Niel Stuart, VC whose First World War service record entitled him to fly the Blue Ensign whilst he was aboard. Following his departure, the liner was employed briefly on the New York CIty to Bermuda route before returning to her original passage.

In 1939 it was proposed that Duchess of York or one of her sisters be modified for use on Canadian-Australasian Line's transpacific route between Sydney and Vancouver via Auckland, Suva and Honolulu. She would replace , which was launched in 1913, as CP Chairman Sir Edward Beatty said that the cost of building new liners for the route was too high. Canadian Pacific and the Union Steamship Company of New Zealand jointly owned the Canadian-Australasian Line, which faced subsidised competition from the US Matson Line.

War service and loss
In 1940, Duchess of York left Greenock on 27 July 1940, bound for Halifax taking evacuated children under the Children's Overseas Reception Board. She returned to Scotland and made a second trip taking another batch of children from Greenock on 10 August 1940, bound for Canada.

She was recommissioned by the British Admiralty as a troopship and used early in the war to transport Canadian soldiers to Britain, returning to Canada carrying RAF aircrew and German prisoners of war (among them legendary escapee Franz von Werra in early January 1941).

Two days later, the convoy was about 300 miles west of Vigo, Spain when it was attacked by three Focke-Wulf Fw 200 aircraft of Kampfgeschwader 40 based at Merignac near Bordeaux. The accurate high-altitude bombing set both Duchess of York and California ablaze. Fearing the flames from the ships would attract U-boats, the Royal Navy sank Duchess of York and California by torpedoes in position  in the early hours of 12 July.

Notes

References
 Musk, George. (1981). Canadian Pacific: The Story of the Famous Shipping Line. Newton Abbot: David & Charles. 
 Tate, E. Mowbray. (1986). Transpacific Steam: The Story of Steam Navigation from the Pacific Coast of North America to the Far East and the Antipodes, 1867–1941. New York: Cornwall Books.  (cloth)

External links
Sea Rescue, SS Duchess of York
Ships of Bermuda, SS Duchess of York
Photographs of SS Duchess of York

Ships of CP Ships
Ocean liners
Troop ships
World War II shipwrecks in the Atlantic Ocean
Ships sunk by German aircraft
Ships built on the River Clyde
1928 ships
Steamships of Canada
Maritime incidents in January 1940
Maritime incidents in July 1943
Troopships of Canada
Ocean liners of Canada